Van Buren Township is one of the fourteen townships of Shelby County, Ohio, United States.  The 2000 census found 1,599 people in the township, 1,424 of whom lived in the unincorporated portions of the township.

Geography
Located in the northwestern corner of the county, it borders the following townships:
Washington Township, Auglaize County - north
Pusheta Township, Auglaize County - northeast corner
Dinsmore Township - east
Franklin Township - southeast
Turtle Creek Township - south
McLean Township - southwest, east of Jackson Township
Jackson Township, Auglaize County - southwest corner, west of McLean Township
German Township, Auglaize County - west
Saint Marys Township, Auglaize County - northwest

The village of Kettlersville lies in central Van Buren Township and the unincorporated community of McCartyville is located in the township's south.

Name and history
Statewide, other Van Buren Townships are located in Darke, Hancock, Putnam counties.

Van Buren township was organized on December 1, 1834.  Its first families had only arrived a short time before: the first white child in the township's present boundaries was Charles Maurer, who was born in the fall of 1833.

Government
The township is governed by a three-member board of trustees, who are elected in November of odd-numbered years to a four-year term beginning on the following January 1. Two are elected in the year after the presidential election and one is elected in the year before it. There is also an elected township fiscal officer, who serves a four-year term beginning on April 1 of the year after the election, which is held in November of the year before the presidential election. Vacancies in the fiscal officership or on the board of trustees are filled by the remaining trustees. The current representative to the regional planning commission is Mark Buehler  Van Buren Township has  currently 3 commissioners, a fiscal officer and a zoning officer shown as follows.
 Commissioner David J. Berning
 Commissioner Dave Kettler
 Commissioner Alan Luthman
 Fiscal Officer Karen Pleiman
 Zoning Officer Jack Schmiesing

References

External links
County website

Townships in Shelby County, Ohio
Townships in Ohio